Alexander Marshall MacKenzie (1 January 1848 – 4 May 1933) was a Scottish architect responsible for prestigious projects including the headquarters of the Isle of Man Banking Company in Douglas, and Australia House and the Waldorf Hotel in London.

He received royal patronage with the design of Crathie Kirk (1893) and was subsequently chosen by the Duke and Duchess of Fife (the Prince of Wales's daughter Princess Louise) for the new (3rd) Mar Lodge (1895).

Early life
Born in Elgin in Morayshire, on 1 January 1848, the son of Thomas Mackenzie, architect, and his wife Helen Margaret McInnes. He was educated at Aberdeen University and trained with James Matthews (1820–98) in Aberdeen from 1863 to 1868. He began his career in the office of David Bryce in Edinburgh.

Professional life
In 1877 he went into partnership in Aberdeen with James Matthews, and later with his own son. The majority of his work was undertaken in northern Scotland. In Aberdeen his work includes St Mark's Church on Rosemount Viaduct (1892). Elphinstone Hall (1926) at King's College, the Art Gallery - (1885), frontage of Marischal College (1904–6) and the neighbouring Greyfriars Church (1906), Harbour Offices (Regent Quay) and Langstane Kirk (or West Church of St Andrew).

Gray’s School of Art and Aberdeen Art Gallery’s design was inspired by Mackenzie’s time of study in Italy (1883).

Mackenzie’s English Westminster Hall and its hammerbeam roof, pictured in the early 19th century.  

English Gothic architecture is evident in Craigiebuckler and Ruthrieston Church’s. Powis Church is in Scots Gothic style.

During 1895 Mackenzie undertook extensive internal restoration work at Udny Parish Church. The buildings structure, which was designed by John Smith in 1821, was not altered but the roof was replaced.

In 1907 he was responsible for widening the Union Bridge and, in 1921, the War Memorial and Cowdray Hall.

In Elgin he designed many public buildings, churches and schools, including the Town Hall and the old Scottish Town House. He made an extension to Banff Academy (1898) and additions to Rothiemay Castle (1902 and 1912). He built Coull House, a grand home for himself at Aboyne.

Further afield, he was responsible for prestigious projects including
 the Isle of Man Banking Company in Douglas, Isle of Man
Australia House and the Waldorf Hotel in London
Hursley House, near Winchester, Hampshire.

He received royal patronage with the design of Crathie Kirk (1893) and was subsequently chosen by the Duke and Duchess of Fife (the Prince of Wales's daughter Princess Louise) for the new (3rd) Mar Lodge (1895) and St Ninian's Chapel, Braemar.

Personal life
Mackenzie married Phoebe Ann Robertson Cooper, the only daughter of Elgin lawyer, Alexander Cooper, of Cooper & Wink. She was a granddaughter of General George Duncan Robertson, head of the Clan Robertson. Their eldest son, Alexander George Robertson Mackenzie, was also a prominent architect. A younger son, Gilbert Marshall Mackenzie (1890 or 1891 – 21 April 1916), also an architect, was called up and commissioned in the Seaforth Highlanders, and was killed in action near Kut.

Alexander Marshall Mackenzie continued working until within a week of his death on 4 May 1933.

Honours
Mackenzie was elected RSA Associate in 1893, and admitted into FRIBA in 1896. He received an honorary LL.D. in 1906, marking the final completion of the Marischal College extension scheme.

References 

Alumni of the University of Aberdeen
1848 births
1933 deaths
People from Elgin, Moray
Architects from Aberdeen
Fellows of the Royal Institute of British Architects